The Sungun copper mine is located in Varzaqan county, East Azarbaijan, Iran,  75 km north west of the provincial town of Ahar. It is the most important geologic and industrial feature in the area and is the largest open-cast copper mine in Iran and is in the primary stages of extraction.

The reserves are estimated to be as much as 995 million tons of copper ore. The ore is processed directly at a concentration plant at the mine. The capacity of the concentration plant is 170,000 tons of copper concentrates, with plans to expand to 300,000 tons.

References
 Singer, D.A., Berger, V.I., and Moring, B.C. (2008): Porphyry copper deposits of the world: Database and grade and tonnage models, 2008. US Geological Survey Open-File Report 2008–1155.
 Hezarkhani, A., and Williams-Jones, A.E. (1998): Controls of alteration and mineralization in the Sungun porphyry copper deposit, Iran; evidence from fluid inclusions and stable isotopes. Economic Geology 93(5), 651–670.
 Hezarkhani, A., Williams-Jones, A.E., and Gammons, C.H. (1999): Factors controlling copper solubility and chalcopyrite deposition in the Sungun porphyry copper deposit, Iran. Mineralium Deposita 34, 770–783.
 Tahmasebi, P., Hezarkhani, A., and Mortazavi, M. (2010): Application of Discriminant Analysis for Alteration Separation; Sungun Copper Deposit, East Azerbaijan, Iran. Australian Journal of Basic and Applied Sciences 6(4), 564–576.
 Hezarkhani, A. (2006): Petrology of the intrusive rocks within the Sungun Porphyry Copper Deposit, Azerbaijan, Iran. Journal of Asian Earth Sciences, 27(3), 26–340.

See also
Mining in Iran

Copper mines in Iran
Varzaqan County